Steenderen is a former municipality and a village in the eastern Netherlands. It has been part of the new municipality of Bronckhorst since 2005.

History 
It was first mentioned in 1046 as Stenere, and means "stone buildings on a sandy ridge". In 1217, a parish church is established. The Dutch Reformed Church has elements dating from the 14th century. In 1782, it suffered a fire after a lightning strike, and was rebuilt. The church was restored between 1966 and 1972. In 1840, it was home to 486 people.

The grist mill Bronkhorstermolen dates from 1844 and was restored in 1960. The potato and chips factory  was founded in Steenderen in 1962. In 2019, a  refrigerator tower was constructed, giving Steenderen three towers.

Former population centres 

Baak
Bronkhorst
Olburgen
Rha
Steenderen
Toldijk

Gallery

References

External links 
Official website

Municipalities of the Netherlands disestablished in 2005
Populated places in Gelderland
Former municipalities of Gelderland
Bronckhorst